Dedunu Wessa (The Rainbow Rain) is a 2006 Sri Lankan Sinhala romantic film directed by Buddhika Jayaratne as his maiden direction and co-produced by Colombo Pictures and Piyal Seneviratne. It stars Buddhika Jayaratne himself, with Malini Fonseka and Jeevan Kumaratunga in lead roles along with Miss Sri Lanka Rozanne Diaz and popular singer Madhumadhawa Aravinda in supportive roles. Music composed by Tharupathi Munasinghe.

Plot

Cast
 Malini Fonseka
 Jeevan Kumaratunga
 Buddhika Jayaratne
 Rozanne Diaz
 Madhumadhawa Aravinda
 Nirosha Perera
 Rajitha Hiran
 Teddy Vidyalankara
 Tharindu Wijesinghe
 Srimal Wedisinghe
 Prashani Perera

References

2006 films
2000s Sinhala-language films